Regina Sandra Burachik is an Argentine mathematician who works on optimization and analysis (particularly: convex analysis, functional analysis and non-smooth analysis). Currently, she is a professor at the University of South Australia.

She earned her Ph.D. from the IMPA in 1995 under the supervision of Alfredo Noel Iusem (Generalized Proximal Point Method for the Variational Inequality Problem). In her thesis, she "introduced and analyzed solution methods for variational inequalities, the latter being a generalization of the convex constrained optimization problem."

Selected publications

Articles
with A. N. Iusem and B. F. Svaiter. "Enlargement of monotone operators with applications to variational inequalities", Set-Valued Analysis
with A. N. Iusem. "A generalized proximal point algorithm for the variational inequality problem in a Hilbert space", SIAM Journal on Optimization
with A. N. Iusem. "Set-valued mappings & enlargements of monotone operators", Optimization and its Applications
with B. F. Svaiter. "Maximal monotone operators, convex functions and a special family of enlargements", Set-Valued Analysis

Books
With Iusem: Set-Valued Mappings and Enlargements of Monotone Operators (2007)
Variational Analysis and Generalized Differentiation in Optimization and Control (2010, as editor)

References

External links

Page at the University of South Australia

Argentine expatriates in Australia
Argentine mathematicians
Argentine women mathematicians
Australian women mathematicians
University of Buenos Aires alumni
Academic staff of the University of South Australia
Instituto Nacional de Matemática Pura e Aplicada alumni
Year of birth missing (living people)
Living people